Kasumigaseki (霞が関, 霞ヶ関 or 霞ケ関) is a district in Chiyoda Ward in Tokyo, Japan. It is the location of most of Japan's cabinet ministry offices.  The name is often used as a metonym for the Japanese government bureaucracy, while Nagatachō  refers to the elected government or the legislative branch. Kasumigaseki Station was one of the stations affected during the Tokyo subway sarin attack.

Notable sites

Government offices

 2nd Bldg. of the Central Common Government Office
Japan Transport Safety Board
National Public Safety Commission
Fair Trade Commission
Coast Guard
Patent Office
Ministry of Internal Affairs and Communications
Ministry of Agriculture, Forestry and Fisheries
Ministry of Economy, Trade and Industry
Ministry of Finance
Ministry of Foreign Affairs
Ministry of Justice
Ministry of Land, Infrastructure, Transport and Tourism
Ministry of Health, Labour and Welfare
Ministry of Education, Culture, Sports, Science and Technology
Ministry of the Environment
Public Security Intelligence Agency
National Police Agency
Financial Services Agency
Agency for Cultural Affairs
National Personnel Authority
Board of Audit of Japan
Tokyo Metropolitan Police HQ
Tokyo High Court and Intellectual Property High Court
Tokyo District Court, Summary Court and Family Court

Other buildings
Japan Post headquarters
Kasumigaseki Building - Tokyo's first high-rise office building
The Asian Development Bank Institute has its head office on the 8th floor of the Kasumigaseki Building. On the same floor, the Asian Development Bank has its Japan offices.
Kasumigaseki Common Gate - Twin tower buildings adjacent to the Kasumigaseki Building.
New Kasumigaseki Building
Nipponkoa Insurance Building

Subway stations
Kasumigaseki Station (Chiyoda Line, Hibiya Line, Marunouchi Line)
Sakuradamon Station (Yūrakuchō Line)
Toranomon Station (Ginza Line)

Economy
Japan Post Holdings has its headquarters in Kasumigaseki. Tokuyama Corporation has its headquarters in Kasumigaseki Common Gate West Tower and PricewaterhouseCoopers has offices on the 15th floor of the Kasumigaseki Building. Also in the Kasumigaseki Building has its headquarters the Lixil Group Corporation.

At different points of time All Nippon Airways and Mitsui Chemicals had their headquarters in the Kasumigaseki Building. In July 1978, when Nippon Cargo Airlines first began, it operated within a single room inside All Nippon Airways's space in the Kasumigaseki Building.

At one time Cantor Fitzgerald had an office in the Toranomon Mitsui Building in Kasumigaseki.

Education
 operates public elementary and junior high schools. Kōjimachi Elementary School (千代田区立麹町小学校) is the zoned elementary of Kasumigaseki 1-3 chōme. There is a freedom of choice system for junior high schools in Chiyoda Ward, and so there are no specific junior high school zones.

References

External links

History of Kasumigaseki 

Districts of Chiyoda, Tokyo